Jorge Alor (Born , Mexico City) is the founding editor of Sputnik, Atomix, and Sonika. He is also the founder of Mexican annual music festival, Manifest.

Editing career

Sputnik 
In 1998, Alor created Sputnik - the first cyber-culture magazine in Spanish. The magazine sought to speak about the human side of technology and how the digital revolution would change all aspects of human life.

The terms, concepts, and topics addressed in the magazine contributed to the emerging media definition of what today is known as digital culture. Many of the predictions or trends recorded in various pieces of the magazine would resolve into palpable realities ten years later.

104 editions of the magazine were published between 1996 and 2010.

Thanks to its style, topics, and innovation, Sputnik received many awards, as follows: the International Design Award, the Quorum Award, and the Award from the Chamber of the Mexican Publishing Industry.

Atomix 
In 1999, along with Oscar Akira Yasser Noriega, he was the co-founder of Atomix - the first multi-platform video games magazine in Mexico, and also the co-founder of EGS Electronic Game Show

Arroba 
The publishing experience at Sputnik led Jorge to collaborate in Arroba (2000-2004) - a radio show on new digital-era technologies and trends which was broadcast by Radioactivo 98.5 FM.

The show became an essential means for all fans and topic experts, for it came along with the ".com” boom - and the industry surrounding it.

Sonika 
In 2001, founded magazine Sonika. It started as an electronica publication - due to the increasing market trend towards this genre.

It started as an electronic publication. Yet, little by little, comments by the readers and the evolution of the industry gave way to addressing other more-sophisticated genres - to later set in at indie music.

The magazine, from its design, challenged the conventional way of speaking music in Mexico. A main feature was the inclusion of a mini CD every month.

Manifest Music Festival
The ever-growing popularity of magazine Sonika led Jorge Alor to create Manifest. A yearly national/international alternative music festival - and one of the first open-air festivals in Mexico.

Manifest was held eight times, on various stages in the main cities in the country: Mexico City, Monterrey, and Guadalajara. During those six years, international musicians (e.g., Ian Brown, The Kills, Delorean, The Faint, Pretty Girls Make Graves, Morning Runner, The Horrors, Yo La Tengo, The Rapture, Interpol, and The Whitest Boy Alive) played at the festival.

BNN 
In 2008 founded agency BNN (Banana) in the year 2008. BNN looked to change the world of advertising via digital and technological means at a time where digital agencies were still not the rule.

Jorge acted as CEO at BNN. He has led digital campaigns and strategies for various holdings brands, such as: Nestlé, Mondeléz, Mabe, Purina, OCESA, Bacardí, BMW, Grupo Lala, Novartis, Marca Mexico, Roche, Heinz, and Coppel, among others.

He is currently the Vice President of the IAB (Interactive Advertising Bureau) in Mexico.

Awards and recognition

External links
Atomix*
20 líderes del internet en Latinoamérica* 
Manifest, nominado a mejor festival en las Lunas del Auditorio* 
12 mitos de la mercadotecnia, con la opinión de Jorge Alor*
Entrevista para el programa de TV "Fractal" de Televisa*

1971 births
Living people
Mexican publishers (people)
Businesspeople from Mexico City